Kinchen is a surname (and rarely given name). Notable individuals with this surname include:

 Brian Kinchen, American football player
 Gary Kinchen, American football player
 James Kinchen, American boxer
 Marc Kinchen, American DJ and producer
 Todd Kinchen, American football player

See also 
 Kinchen Holloway House

 English-language surnames
 German-language surnames
 Americanized surnames